Grace Min was the defending champion, having won the event in 2011, but did not compete.

Wildcard Samantha Crawford defeated twelfth seed Anett Kontaveit in the final 7–5, 6–3, to win her first junior grand slam title.

Seeds

Qualifiers

Main draw

Final rounds

Top half

Section 1

Section 2

Bottom half

Section 3

Section 4

External links 
 Main draw

Girls' Singles
US Open, 2012 Girls' Singles